Paul Gutkeled was a Hungarian influential lord, ban of Severin between 1272 and 1275 under Ladislaus IV of Hungary reign.

Career in Hungary
He was appointed many times as ban of Severin by king Ladislaus IV of Hungary between 1272 and 1275.

References

Sources

 

13th-century Hungarian people
Paul
Bans of Severin